Glacidorbis is a genus of minute freshwater snails with an operculum, aquatic gastropod molluscs or micromolluscs in the family Glacidorbidae.

This genus has proved to be somewhat enigmatic in terms of where it belongs within the taxonomy of the gastropods. It was previously thought to belong in the family Hydrobiidae or even in the Basommatophora.

Species
Species within the genus Glacidorbis include:
 Glacidorbis atrophus Ponder & Avern, 2000
 Glacidorbis bicarinatus Ponder & Avern, 2000
 Glacidorbis catomus Ponder & Avern, 2000
 Glacidorbis circulus Ponder & Avern, 2000
 Glacidorbis costatus Ponder & Avern, 2000
 Glacidorbis decoratus Ponder & Avern, 2000
 Glacidorbis hedleyi Iredale, 1943 — the type species
 Glacidorbis isolatus Ponder & Avern, 2000
 Glacidorbis occidentalis Bunn & Stoddart, 1983
 Glacidorbis otwayensis Ponder & Avern, 2000
 Glacidorbis rusticus Ponder & Avern, 2000
 Glacidorbis tasmanicus Ponder & Avern, 2000
 Glacidorbis troglodytes Ponder & Avern, 2000

Transferred to other taxa:
 Glacidorbis pawpela Smith, 1979 is a synonym for Benthodorbis pawpela
 Glacidorbis pedderi (Smith, 1973) is a synonym for Striadorbis pedderi
 Glacidorbis  magallanicus Meier-Brook et Smith, 1976 is a synonym for Gondwanorbis magallanicus (Meier-Brook et Smith, 1976)

References

Glacidorbidae
Taxonomy articles created by Polbot